Minuscule 93 (in the Gregory-Aland numbering), α 51 (Soden), formerly known as Codex Graevii, is a Greek minuscule manuscript of the New Testament, on parchment leaves. Palaeographically it has been assigned to the 10th-century.

Formerly it was labelled it by 17a, 21p, and 18r.
It has full marginalia.

Description 

The codex contains the text of the New Testament except of the Gospels, with some lacunae (Romans 16:17-27; 1 Corinthians 1:1-7; Hebrews 13:15-25; Revelation 1:1-5), on 270 parchment leaves. The order of books is a usual for the Greek manuscripts: Acts, Catholic epistles, Pauline epistles, and Apocalypse. The Hebrews follows Philemon.

The text is written in one column per page, 27 lines per page. Text of Rev 1:1-5 was supplied by a later hand.

It has an additional material: Life of prophets and treatise of Pseudo-Dorotheus about 12 apostles and 70 disciples of Jesus (as codices 82, 177, 459, 613, 617, 699).

Text 

The Greek text of the codex is a representative of the Byzantine text-type. Aland placed it in Category V. 
In Catholic epistles it has 20-30% non-Byzantine readings.

History 

In 1079 the manuscript was bought by Antonius, a monk. It was held in Constantinople and was purchased by Pierre Séguier (1588–1672). It was examined by Bernard de Montfaucon Johann Jakob Wettstein, and Paulin Martin. C. R. Gregory saw the manuscript in 1885. Herman C. Hoskier collated the text of the Apocalypse.

Formerly it was labelled it by 17a, 21p, and 18r. In 1908 Gregory gave the number 93 to it.

It is currently housed in at the Bibliothèque nationale de France (Fonds Coislin, Gr. 205), at Paris.

See also 

 List of New Testament minuscules
 Biblical manuscript
 Textual criticism

References

Further reading 

 Herman C. Hoskier, Concerning the Text of the Apocalypse: Collation of All Existing Available Greek Documents with the Standard Text of Stephen’s Third Edition Together with the Testimony of Versions, Commentaries and Fathers. 1 vol. (London: Bernard Quaritch, Ltd., 1929), p. 37. (for r)

External links 
 Minuscule 93 at the Encyclopedia of Textual Criticism

Greek New Testament minuscules
10th-century biblical manuscripts
Bibliothèque nationale de France collections